To Live or Let Die is a 1982 American short documentary film directed by Terry Sanders. It was nominated for an Academy Award for Best Documentary Short.

References

External links
To Live or Let Die at the American Film Foundation

1982 films
1982 short films
1982 documentary films
American short documentary films
Films directed by Terry Sanders
1980s English-language films
1980s American films